One Size Fits All is the second studio album by Pink Cream 69, released in 1991.

When Andi Deris joined Helloween, he began playing the song "Where the Eagle Learns to Fly" live on many occasions.

Track listing

CD edition bonus track

Singles
Ballerina
 "Ballerina"
 "Signs of Danger"
 "White Men Do No Reggae (live)

Do You Like It Like That
 "Do You Like It Like That" (edit)
 "Ballerina"
 "Hell's Gone Crazy"

Personnel
 Andi Deris - vocals
 Alfred Koffler - guitar
 Dennis Ward - bass
 Kosta Zafiriou - drums

References

Pink Cream 69 albums
1991 albums
Epic Records albums
Albums produced by Dirk Steffens